A statue of Irene Robledo is installed along the Rotonda de los Jaliscienses Ilustres in Centro, Guadalajara, in the Mexican state of Jalisco. Before its installation (and that of Rita Pérez Jiménez) the roundabout was named the "Rotonda de los Hombres Ilustres". Robledo's rests remain there. The statue was installed in 2000.

References

External links

 

2000 establishments in Mexico
2000 sculptures
Outdoor sculptures in Guadalajara
Rotonda de los Jaliscienses Ilustres
Sculptures of women in Mexico
Statues in Jalisco